The 2017–18 Eerste Divisie, known as Jupiler League for sponsorship reasons, was the sixty-second season of Eerste Divisie since its establishment in 1955. It began in August 2017 with the first matches of the season and ended in May 2018 with the returns of the finals of the promotion/relegation play-offs, involving also the 16th- and 17th-placed teams from the 2017–18 Eredivisie.

Teams 
A total of 20 teams took part in the league. 2016–17 Eerste Divisie champions VVV-Venlo gained promotion to the Eredivisie, and was replaced by Go Ahead Eagles, who finished bottom in the 2016–17 Eredivisie. NAC won the post-season playoff, and were replaced by NEC. Also, Achilles '29 were relegated and replaced by Tweede Divisie champions Jong AZ who became the fifth reserve side to feature in the second tier of Dutch football.

At an extraordinary KNVB federation meeting on 2 October 2017, representatives of amateur and professional football reached an agreement about the route to be taken to renew the football pyramid. Part of the agreement was that no promotion/relegation would take place between the Eerste and Tweede Divisie this season.

Personnel and kits

Standings

Period tables

Period 1

Period 2

Period 3

Period 4

Results

Season statistics

Top scorers 

Source: soccerway, Jupiler League

Hat-tricks(+)

Assists 

Source: Soccerway, Jupiler League

Promotion/relegation play-offs 
Ten teams, two from the Eredivisie and eight from the Eerste Divisie, played for two spots in the 2018–19 Eredivisie, the remaining eight teams playing in the 2018–19 Eerste Divisie.

Key: * = Play-off winners, (a) = Wins because of away goals rule, (e) = Wins after extra time in second leg, (p) = Wins after penalty shoot-out.

References

External links 
 

Eerste Divisie seasons
Netherlands
2017–18 in Dutch football